Khalid ibn al-Walid invaded the city of Dumat Al-Jandal in April 631 AD, under the orders of Muhammad to retaliate for the killings of preachers that had previously been sent by him. He also ordered Khalid to destroy an idol that was worshipped by the Bani Kalb tribe.

This was the second time Khalid was sent on a military invasion to Dumat Al-Jandal. He was also sent to Dumatul Jandal in March 631 to invade the land of a Christian prince who ruled the area.

Wadd

Wadd meaning the God of Love and Friendship, also known as Almaqah, ʻAmm and Sīn, was the Minaean moon god. Snakes were held sacred to the believers of Wadd. He is mentioned in the Qur'an (71:23) as a God in the time of the Prophet, Noah.

And they say: By no means leave your gods, nor leave Wadd, nor Suwa'; nor Yaghuth, and Ya'uq and Nasr. (Qur'an 71:23)
Before it razed by invasion of Khalid, the temple of Wadd was located at Dumatol Jandal.

Expedition
Muhammad sent Khalid ibn Walid to demolish Wadd after the battle of Tabuk
, an idol worshipped by the Banu Kalb tribe.

Khalid went to Dumat Al-Jandal to destroy it, but the Banu Abd-Wadd and the Banu Amir al Ajdar tribes resisted. Khalid  slew all resistance, Ibn Kalbi also mentions that among those slaughtered were Qatan ibn-Shurayb, whose mother wept at his death and fell over to his body and started sobbing until she died. Khalid demolished the deistic symbol and destroyed the entire shrine.

Islamic primary sources

The Muslim historian Hisham Ibn Al-Kalbi, mentions this event as follows:

See also
Military career of Muhammad
List of expeditions of Muhammad

References

630s conflicts
Campaigns ordered by Muhammad
631